This is a list of stations that were affiliated with UPN in the United States at the time of network closure. UPN shut down on September 15, 2006. Former affiliates of UPN became affiliates of The CW, MyNetworkTV, another network,  reverted to independent status, or shut down entirely. The Fox-owned stations dropped UPN between August 31 and September 1, 2006.

Key:
1 = UPN affiliate which joined The CW Television Network
² = UPN affiliate which joined MyNetworkTV
³ = UPN affiliate which became independent
4 = status uncertain
5 = UPN affiliate which joined Retro Television Network 
6 = UPN affiliate which joined CBS and carries MNTV on DT2 subchannel
7 = UPN affiliate which joined FOX on 8/21
8 = UPN affiliate which joined ABC on 9/1
9 = Station has since ceased operations
10 = Station has since ceased operations on its LPTV signal, but is still in operation as a digital subchannel
11 = Station lost UPN affiliation to WNLO in 2003, currently MeTV affiliate
12 = Joined MyNetworkTV after UPN's shutdown, but became a CW affiliate from 2016 to 2019 with MNTV retained as a secondary affiliation)
13 = Station has ceased operations but remains as a digital subchannel on a sister station
Key affiliates of UPN that were owned by United Television/Chris-Craft Television, Viacom & CBS Corporation during their time as a UPN affiliate are denoted in bold.

Owned-and-operated stations

UPN stations formerly owned by Chris-Craft and those that at the close of the network were owned by CBS Corporation were sometimes considered O&Os, and several transactions have involved these stations:

Not too long after becoming a UPN O&O itself, KRRT (now KMYS) in San Antonio was sold to Jet Broadcasting in 1995, eventually becoming a WB, then MyNetworkTV, and now The CW affiliate under Sinclair ownership.
Upon Chris-Craft's exit from the television industry, its UPN stations were sold to the Fox Television Stations Group. Of those stations, San Francisco's KBHK (now KBCW) was traded to CBS Corporation, while Portland's KPTV was traded to Meredith Corporation, and is now a Fox affiliate. KMSP in Minneapolis-St. Paul then traded its UPN affiliation to WFTC for that station's Fox affiliation. Fox had acquired WFTC not long after the Chris-Craft purchase was finalized. The remaining UPN stations kept by Fox retained their UPN affiliations, but were no longer O&Os of the network - giving UPN the dubious distinction of being the only broadcast network whose stations in the three largest markets of New York, Los Angeles, and Chicago were not O&Os. These stations became O&Os of Fox's new network MyNetworkTV, as UPN and The WB closed down order to launch The CW, and Fox announced none of their UPN stations would join The CW. In fact, Chris-Craft's former NYC station, WWOR-TV, is the second area station to have been an O&O of 2 major networks (after sister WNYW), and its former LA station, KCOP, is the first (second if counting KTLA) station in its area to be O&Oed by 2 networks.
Viacom/CBS sold off several UPN O&Os in the network's final five years. Mercury Broadcasting bought Wichita's KSCC (now KMTW) in 2001 (a newly launched station, LMA'd to Clear Channel Communications at the time, and subsequently to Newport Television and Sinclair Broadcast Group), and Houston's KTXH and Washington's WDCA were sold to Fox in the same year (as part of the aforementioned swap with KBHK). In 2005, Indianapolis' WNDY-TV and Columbus' WWHO were sold to LIN TV; Oklahoma City's KAUT was sold to The New York Times Company (who has since sold its entire television group to Local TV), and WUPL in New Orleans was sold to Belo. In September 2006, KTXH and WDCA became My Network TV O&Os.

References

UPN